Marino Girolami (1 February 1914 – 20 February 1994) was an Italian film director and actor.

Biography
Marino Giorlami was born on 1 February 1914 in Rome, Italy. Formally a Professional boxer, Girolami ended his boxing career when he was 20. Following this, he got a degree as a physical therapist and opened a gym which specialized in therapeutic massages. Girolami entered into Italy Centro Sperimentale di Cinematografia. Among the people Girolami met was Anna Magnani who took her son Luca to meet him which led to close relationship between them. Girolami gave her the script he had been working on of Campo de'fiori which was passed on to Aldo Fabrizi. The story was re-written by Girolami and Federico Fellini and directed by Mario Bonnard, which led to Girolami working in film. He debuted as an actor in 1940, and became an assistant director for Mario Soldati, Marcello Marchesi, Vittorio Metz. In 1949 he debuted as a director with La strada buia, a variation on the film Fugitive Lady. He followed the film with several musical comedies and melodramas.

Film historian and critic Roberto Curti described Girolami as one of Italy's most prolific genre directors, directing 78 films in three decades. Girolami worked in several genres and trends such as the Western with Between God, the Devil and a Winchester, the crime film (Violent Rome) and horror with Zombie Holocaust. Girolami also made hardcore pornography such as Sesso profondo. Girolami died on 20 February 1994 in Rome.

Personal life
Girolami was the older brother of director Romolo Girolami, who worked with Marino as an assistant director on some of his films such as Il Mio amico Jekyll and later directed under the name Romolo Guerrieri. Marino Girolami is also the father of actor Ennio Girolami and director Enzo G. Castellari.

Select filmography
Note: The films listed as N/A are not necessarily chronological.

References

Notes

Bibliography

External links

1914 births
1994 deaths
Film directors from Rome
Poliziotteschi directors